The Radisson Blu Hotel Shanghai New World, also known as Radisson Hotel Shanghai New World or Radisson New World Hotel, is a hotel located at 88 Nanjing Road West (南京路88号), across from People's Park, in Shanghai's Huangpu District, in China.

Time Out Shanghai offers the following description: "This 520-roomed behemoth offers guests the typical Radisson experience, with a few special dining features like Epicure on 45, a revolving restaurant on the 45th floor, and the Sky Dome Bar, which offers live music six nights a week under the hotel's iconic glass ceiling."

See also

 List of tallest buildings in Shanghai

References

External links

 
 Radisson Blu Hotel Shanghai New World at Lonely Planet

Hotel buildings completed in 2005
Hotels established in 2005
Hotels in Shanghai
Huangpu District, Shanghai
Radisson Blu